Digital Dope: The Reintroduction is the street album by American rapper E.S.G. from Houston, Texas. It was released on February 10, 2009 via Gracie Productions. The album features guest appearances from Big T, C-Note and Lil' Keke among others.

The single from the album is "Actin' Bad".

Track listing

References

2009 albums
E.S.G. (rapper) albums